Amp or AMP may refer to:

 Ampere, a unit of electric current, often shortened to amp
 Amplifier, a device that increases the amplitude of a signal

Arts and entertainment

Music 
 After Midnight Project, Los Angeles alternative rock band
 Amp (band), UK
 AMP (magazine), US, 2003–2013
 Annual Australian Music Prize
 MTV's Amp, 1997 compilation

Other uses in arts and entertainment 
 Amp (TV series), music video show
 The Amp, a British music video channel
 The Amp (St. Augustine), outdoor amphitheater in St. Augustine, Florida, U.S.
 AMP Radio Networks, Malaysia

Organizations 
 Alliance of the Presidential Majority (Alliance pour la majorité présidentielle), Democratic Republic of Congo
 American Manufacturing and Packaging, Cookeville, Tennessee, US
 American Muslims for Palestine, Illinois
 Americans for Medical Progress
 Ameriprise Financial, NYSE symbol
 The AMP, a youth center and music venue in Minot, North Dakota, U.S.
 AMP Incorporated, U.S. connector company
 AMP Limited, Australian financial services company
 Amp Electric Vehicles
 Anjaman Mozareen Punjab, organisation for land rights in Pakistan
 Association of Muslim Professionals, Singapore

People 
 Amp Lee (born 1971), American football coach
 Air Member for Personnel, RAF appointment
 Air Member for Personnel (Australia), RAAF

Places 
 Advanced Manufacturing Park, UK
 Ampanihy Airport (IATA code), Madagascar
 Atlantic Motorsport Park, near Shubenacadie, Nova Scotia, Canada

Science and technology

Computing 

  HTML code for the ampersand symbol &
 AMP (software stack), "Apache, MySQL and PHP"
 Asymmetric multiprocessing
 C++ AMP, C++ Accelerated Massive Parallelism
 Accelerated Mobile Pages, a web component framework

Biology 
 Adenosine monophosphate, a nucleotide found in RNA
 AMP deaminase, a human enzyme encoded by the AMPD1 gene
 Antimicrobial peptides, immune system peptides

Other uses in science and technology 
 Affect misattribution procedure, a psychological measure of implicit attitudes
 AutoMag (pistol)

Other uses 
 Administrative Monetary Penalty, a civil penalty
 Amp Energy, a drink
 Amplified Bible, an English translation
 Asiatic mode of production, a Marxist theory on historical Asian socioeconomic organization
 Asset Management Plan, in infrastructure management

See also

 AMPS (disambiguation)
 Amped (disambiguation)
 Ampere (disambiguation)